Justice Caldwell may refer to:

Colbert Caldwell (1822–1892), associate justice of the Texas Supreme Court
Millard Caldwell (1897–1984), associate justice of the Florida Supreme Court
Waller C. Caldwell (1849–1924), associate justice of the Tennessee Supreme Court
William B. Caldwell (judge) (1808–1876), associate justice of the Ohio Supreme Court

See also
Judge Caldwell (disambiguation)